Ashleworth (sometimes formerly spelled ‘Ashelworth’) is a village and civil parish in the Tewkesbury district of Gloucestershire, England, with a population of 614 (United Kingdom Census 2021), about six miles north of Gloucester. It has a riverside pub, the Boat Inn.  The oldest part of the village is Ashleworth Quay, on a flood plain on the west bank of the River Severn.

History
The origins of the settlement go back at least to the Roman occupation; in recent years a number of Romano-British artefacts have been excavated in the area around the Quay dating from A.D.69 to A.D.390.

An ancient ferry, which used to link Ashleworth Quay to Sandhurst village on the east bank of the river closed in the 1950s.  In medieval times the Quay was a major crossing point for the river as the flood meadows here are narrower than they are for many miles upstream. Consequently, Ashleworth would have been the last place from which to cross before reaching the outskirts of Tewkesbury, nearly eight miles upstream.

Near the Quay is the ancient parish church of Saints Andrew and Bartholomew, the Manor, the Court, the historic Tithe Barn and the Boat Inn which has been run by the Jelf family for nearly 400 years.

The village was mentioned in the Domesday Book (1086), at which time it was called Escelesworde, which translates loosely as Aescel's farmstead, or enclosure. After the Norman Conquest the manor was held by the Earls of Berkeley, but in the 12th century Robert Fitzharding, the earl at that time, gifted Ashleworth to St Augustine's Abbey, Bristol. Henry VIII later gave the manor to the Bishop of Gloucester.

The larger, more modern, part of the village spreads out from the village green situated on higher ground about half a mile to the Northwest. Near the Green is the village school and the former Queens Arms public house, now a private residence, with the centre of the village with its Memorial Hall and Post Office shop a couple of hundred yards further up the hill.

Monuments

Sts Andrew and Bartholomew Church The church is primarily 12th and 13th century, with later remodelling, but the origins are pure Saxon. Much of the north wall is built of striking Saxon herringbone stonework. The interior features one of the earliest known examples of a royal coat of arms (featuring a lion and a dragon) over the south chapel; this dates from the reign of Edward VI or, possibly, Elizabeth I. The church is Grade I listed.

Ashleworth Tithe Barn Adjacent to the court and church is a huge medieval tithe barn, now in the care of the National Trust. The barn was built in the period 1481 - 1515 by Abbot Newland of Bristol Abbey, and consists of ten bays. The interior roofing is a wonderful example of medieval timber framing.

The Preaching Cross A 14th century preaching cross stands upon a three-step plinth on the village green. Though the Ashleworth example is called a 'cross', it is really more of a simple column with a four sided top which has been carved with religious scenes. The cross was lost for many years until it was found hidden in a chimney in one of the cottages that line the green. The scenes carved upon the cross are thought to represent Mary and John, a Virgin and Child, St Augustine, and Robert Fitzharding, founder of Bristol Abbey.

Other Historic Buildings Apart from the church and tithe barn, Ashleworth has a number of older buildings, although they are not generally open to the public. These include Ashleworth Court, built in 1460, and still retaining its great hall, Ashleworth Manor (1460), a half-timbered manor house once owned by the Abbot of Bristol, and Foscombe House, a Victorian Gothic fantasy constructed by Thomas Fulljames.  Ashleworth Court is Grade I listed.

See also

Ashleworth Ham
Berkeley (hundred)

External links 
 
 Photos of Ashleworth and surrounding area on geograph.org.uk
 

Villages in Gloucestershire
Borough of Tewkesbury